SoundayMusic (Formerly known as Soundtracker) is a geosocial networking mobile music streaming app that enables users to listen to and track the music their friends and neighbors are playing in real time. The service provides over 32 million tracks and allows users to create "music stations" choosing between a mix of up to three artists, or choosing a music genre. In the free version users can create up to 10 personalized stations, look at the stations that are being played nearby in real time, and interact with other users through instant chat.
The paid, premium subscription removes advertisements and allows users to create an unlimited number of stations. It was launched in 2009> by Soundtracker, and as of December 2014 the service had 1.3 million registered users. Soundtracker is available for iOS App Store, Android Google Play, Windows Phone Store, Windows Store, Google Glass, BlackBerry World, Samsung Apps, Amazon Appstore, Nook, and Samsung Smart TV, in 10 languages: English, Spanish, French, German, Portuguese, Italian, Chinese Simplified, Japanese, Korean and Russian.
Soundtracker is a registered trademark.

Beginnings
The company was formed in late 2008 by a team composed of Daniele Calabrese and 25 software developers and designers. Soundtracker was first marketed in 2010 in San Francisco, and today has offices in Washington DC and Cagliari, Italy.

Evolution
The first mobile platform, iOS, was developed by Daniele Calabrese and his team in Silicon Valley in 2009. The iOS app at its inception featured 13 million tracks and allowed geo-tagging.

In 2010 the team moved to Boston where it developed the stations, push notifications, interaction with nearby listeners, and the app for Windows Phone 7. Also in 2010, a website was introduced to provide access to non-mobile users, and the app was made available on Android, Java, Windows 7 and BlackBerry platforms.

In 2011 the app was integrated with Facebook, Twitter, Foursquare and Songkick.

In the second half of 2013, a system of in-app purchase and premium subscription was implemented allowing users to create an unlimited number of stations.

In June 2014 Soundtracker launched Autodiscovery, a button that discovers the music played in a certain area.

In October 2014, the App launched a location and proximity based advertising service with Facebook and Twitter.

Features

Playlists
Soundtracker allows users to create playlists by choosing between artists, genre, or using the Autodiscovery feature. Each playlist features new music based on an algorithm for music discovery. The playlists are geolocated and users can see the playlists that are being played around them on a map.

Autodiscovery
In June 2014 Soundtracker introduced Autodiscovery, available on the iOS and Android platforms. Similar to Shazam, the app analyzes a track being played and provides the user with its details. It offers the option to create a station, buy the track from iTunes or Google Play Music, or watch the related music video on YouTube.

Proximity
In September 2014 Soundtracker implemented Proximity a feature that allows a user to listen to music with people nearby in real time. Using the live broadcasting option, a user can meet people nearby by tuning into their stations. Proximity was implemented using the Wireless Registry, the first global registry for wireless names and identifiers.

Social network integration
Soundtracker is integrated with major social networks, such as Facebook and Twitter. Geolocation and geotag is possible because of integration with Foursquare, and Songkick provides the latest updates about live concerts or shows by the selected artist.

Analytics platform
Soundtracker captures user data and combines it with other data sources to generate information that can be retrieved and filtered by business intelligence tools.

Revenue model
Sounstracker is an ad-based music streaming service which offers the option of an ad-free subscription.

Advertisement
In October 2014, in addition to traditional advertising banners in the app, Soundtracker implemented in-app advertising with Facebook Audience Network and Twitter Mopub.

Subscriptions
Soundtracker offers two different type of plans: basic and premium. The basic plan allows users to create up to ten free stations from the music catalogue. The Premium plan contains no ads and allows users to create an unlimited number of stations, listen to the top user generated charts in seven countries divided by music genre.

Royalties
Soundtracker is a non-interactive webcaster with compulsory license from copyright societies and the right to use any music or recording that have been released to the public. It pays royalties to copyright societies, ASCAP, BMI and SESAC, the portion of royalties are between 3% and 5% of total revenues. Soundtracker also negotiates directly with indie labels and artists.

Future projects
The company is developing applications for the automotive industry, as well as a special design of the app for different kinds of wearable technology.

See also

References

External links

 

2008 establishments in California
Android (operating system) software
BlackBerry software
Companies based in Washington, D.C.
Internet radio in the United States
IOS software
Windows Phone software
Windows software